Salla may refer to:

Places
Salla, municipality in Lapland, Finland
Salla, Styria, municipality in Voitsberg, Styria, Austria
Salla, Estonia, village in Rakke Parish, Lääne-Viru County, Estonia
Salla Qullu, mountain in Bolivia

People
Salla Tykkä (born 1973), Finnish visual artist
Salla Irja (1912 - 1966), Finnish writer

Other
Salla disease, genetic disorder
La Salla, 1996 Canadian film